The Center for Ethics at Yeshiva University, located on Yeshiva University’s Wilf Campus in New York's Washington Heights neighborhood, fosters research on ethical issues and the integration of discourse on ethics into the curriculum among Yeshiva University's schools. The Center seeks to provide opportunities for interdisciplinary collaboration among Yeshiva University's schools.

Adrienne Asch, PhD, the center's director, is the Edward and Robin Milstein Professor of Bioethics at Wurzweiler School of Social Work and Professor of Epidemiology and Population Health at Albert Einstein College of Medicine, both Yeshiva University graduate professional schools.

The center's activities include:
 the creation of new courses and curricular materials for undergraduate and professional education
 lectures, workshops, and conferences with leading international scholars and experts from across the spectrum of Jewish thinking
 faculty seminars examining particular themes and topics, resulting in the publication of original research

The center also hosts the Leonard and Tobee Kaplan Scholar-in-Residence program, designed to provide opportunities for interdisciplinary collaboration among Yeshiva University's schools. In 2007, Michael Walzer served as the center's inaugural scholar-in-residence. In 2008, Onora O'Neill will serve as scholar-in-residence.

External links 
 Yeshiva University (official site)
 The Center for Ethics at Yeshiva University (official site)

Yeshiva University
Ethics organizations